Julia Gillard (born 1961) is an Australian former politician and lawyer who served as the Prime Minister of Australia from 2010−2013.

Gillard may also refer to:

People
 Brett Gillard (born 1970), Australian rugby league footballer 
 Doug Gillard (born 1965), American guitarist
 Frank Gillard (1909–1998), British radio broadcaster and administrator
 Ian Gillard (born 1950), English footballer
 Nick Gillard (born 1955), film stunt performer
 Reg Gillard (1920−2001), Australian politician
 Stuart Gillard (born 1950), Canadian film director
 William Gillard (1812–1897), British painter

Other uses
 Gillard (kart manufacturer), British kart manufacturer

See also
 Franck Gilard (born 1950), French politician
 Gilliard (disambiguation)